Cryptopenaeus clevai is a species of decapod within the family Solenoceridae. The species is found near Indonesia, in the Indian Ocean and Caspian Sea, where it lives at depths of 410 to 587 meters.

References 

Crustaceans described in 1984
Crustaceans of the Indian Ocean
Fauna of the Caspian Sea
Solenoceridae